The Rusanovskoye gas field is a natural gas field located in the Yamalo-Nenets Autonomous Okrug. It was discovered around 1980 and is not yet in production.

See also

West Siberian petroleum basin

References

Natural gas fields in Russia
Natural gas fields in the Soviet Union